Sara Haider is a Pakistani singer-songwriter and musical and film actress from Karachi. She started her music career as a backing vocalist and later became singer at Coke Studio. She has also won a Lux Style Award after making debut in Coke Studio.

Life and career
Sara Haider was born in Karachi, Pakistan. She started her career as a musical actress by performing in stage musical Grease. She also performed at Ufone Uth Records and Apeejay Kolkata Literary Festival in India. In 2014, Sara joined Coke Studio season 7 where she served as backing vocalist. She gained public recognition in Coke Studio season 8 where she made her debut with the song "Ae Dil" featuring Ali Zafar She has also won Lux Style Awards for "Best Emerging Talent". She will make her debut in film by appearing in the upcoming short-drama film Khaemae Mein Matt Jhankain which is scheduled for release at Zeal for Unity film festival in India and Pakistan. She graduated from American Academy of Dramatic Arts and won the prestigious Charles Jehlinger Award.

Filmography
 Khaemae Mein Matt Jhankain

Discography 

 Ae Dil – Coke Studio (Pakistani season 8)
 Meri Meri – Coke Studio (Pakistani season 9) 
 Ja Ba Ja
 Zindagi – Pepsi Battle of the Bands 
 Dekha De Rung Apna – Levi Strauss & Co. 
 Khayal Rakhna – Strepsils Stereo

Awards and nominations

References

External links
 
 Sara Haider on Facebook
 Sara Haider on Instagram
 Sara Haider on Twitter

Pakistani pop singers
Living people
Singers from Karachi
Musical theatre actresses
Year of birth missing (living people)